Samaniego is a town and municipality in the Nariño Department, Colombia.

Samaniego is known as the landscape's city and musical of Nariño. The majority of the city's population is dedicated to coffee and sugar cane to manufacture a handcrafted product named Panela, similar to sugar. Their coffee is known for its amazing softness and great smell of this form finding the greatest treasure unknown for the world to have the best coffee in the world of a unmatched quality that can be found in the principal market in the city Friday and Saturday made handcrafted in first place removing impurities in the coffee manually grain by grain and after it is toasted in firewood into of and mud skillet together at the privileged mountains sprinkled in the volcanic ashes of the Galeras Volcano, Samaniego is known for having the principal youngest musical competition in Nariño, called the Departmental Competition of Musical Bands and Meeting of Dances in Nariño, where 20 musical bands have a competition to be the best band in Nariño and represent Nariño in other band competitions like in the Vega - Cundinamarca, San Pedro - Valle and Paipa - Boyaca.

Eight people were killed in the August 2020 Massacre of Samaniego. The victims are identified as Brayan Cuaran, Bairón Patiño, Elian Benavides, Daniel Vargas, Laura Riascos, Joan Quintero, Rubén Ibarra, and Óscar Obando.

References

Municipalities of Nariño Department